TeachTown is an American company that provides educational software to schools, clinicians and parents for children diagnosed with autism spectrum disorder, developmental disabilities, intellectual disabilities, or emotional and behavior disorders. The characters are Jelly, Mochi, Ginger and Pico.

History
TeachTown was founded in Seattle, Washington in 2003 by Chris Whalen, Lars Liden, Eric Dallaire, and Sven Liden. TeachTown received initial financial backing from Washington Research Foundation following its second-prize win of the University of Washington's business plan competition.  This was soon followed up with support from Seattle-based angel investors, and Kevin MacDonald joining to lead technical operations. Some of the angel investors were noted as being parents of children with autism.

In 2006, TeachTown merged with Animated Speech Corporation. Feshbach became TeachTown's largest investor and CEO.

Terry Thoren took on the role of president and CEO in 2009.

In 2012 Dave Cappellucci assumed the CEO position, with Dan Feshbach remaining as chairman of the board. The company was re-capitalized and TeachTown became a subsidiary of Jigsaw Learning LLC.

Bain Capital acquired TeachTown in 2021 through its Bain Capital Double Impact program.

References 

Autism-related organizations in the United States
Education companies of the United States
Software companies based in Massachusetts
Software companies established in 2003
Privately held companies based in Massachusetts
American companies established in 2003
2003 establishments in Washington (state)
Companies based in Middlesex County, Massachusetts
Woburn, Massachusetts
Special education